The 2020 ITTF Men's World Cup was a table tennis competition held in Weihai, China, from 13 to 15 November 2020. It was the 41st edition of the ITTF-sanctioned event.
After series of cancellation of tournaments due to the impact of the COVID-19 pandemic on sports this year, the ITTF World Cup is one of the three year-end tournaments that conclude the table tennis calendar in 2020. The other two, 2020 ITTF Finals and the inaugural World Table Tennis Macao), were also all held in November in China.

Qualification

Competition format 
The tournament consisted of two stages: a preliminary group stage and a knockout stage. The players seeded 9 to 21 were drawn into four groups. The top two players from each group then joined the top eight seeded players in the second stage of the competition, which consisted of a knockout draw.

Seeding 
The seeding list was based on the official ITTF world ranking for November 2020.

Preliminary stage 
The preliminary group stage took place on 13 November, with the top two players in each group progressing to the main draw.

Main draw
The knockout stage took place from 14–15 November.

See also 
 2020 World Team Table Tennis Championships
 2020 ITTF World Tour
 2020 ITTF Finals
 2020 ITTF Women's World Cup

References

External links 
 Tournament page on ITTF website

Men
World Cup (men)
Table tennis competitions in China
ITTF Men's World Cup
ITTF Men's World Cup